Fairbank is a ghost town in Cochise County, Arizona, next to the San Pedro River. First settled in 1881, Fairbank was the closest rail stop to nearby Tombstone, which made it an important location in the development of southeastern Arizona. The town was named for Chicago investor Nathaniel Kellogg Fairbank who partially financed the railroad, and was the founder of the Grand Central Mining Company, which had an interest in the silver mines in Tombstone.  Today Fairbank is located within the San Pedro Riparian National Conservation Area (San Pedro RNCA).

History

Originally the location of a Native American village known as Santa Cruz in the 18th century, the area was later settled around the time the railroad came through in 1881, and developed further when the local railroad station was built in 1882.  It was originally known as Junction City, then Kendall, then Fairbanks, and was formally founded as Fairbank on May 16, 1883 on the same day that the local Post Office opened.

Due to its proximity to Tombstone, and the fact that it boasted the nearest railroad station to what was one of the largest cities in the western United States, Fairbank acted as a way point between Tombstone and the rest of the country, bringing supplies into the bustling town, and also acting as the departure point for the ore pulled from Tombstone's silver mines on its way to the mills in Contention City and Charleston.  Fairbank was also home to a stage coach station on the Butterfield Overland Mail line which opened in 1885.  At its height in the mid-1880s, the town housed approximately 100 residents, and boasted a steam quartz mill, a general store, a butcher shop, a restaurant, a saloon, a Wells Fargo office, the railroad depot, and a stage coach station.

When the Tombstone mines closed after flooding in 1886, Fairbank's prominence declined as the nearby mills shutdown, and the rail depot it offered became increasingly unnecessary.  Subsequent droughts drove away area farmers and ranchers, further isolating the town.  Fairbank was reprieved from a possible extinction when the railroad linked nearby Bisbee to Fairbank's train depot in 1889, making Fairbank an important leg in the transit of copper mined from the highly productive Copper Queen Mine.  However, the flooding of the San Pedro River in September 1890 caused significant property damage, thinning down the population further.

On February 15, 1900, Fairbank was the scene of an attempted train robbery of the express car on the Benson–Nogales train by the Burt Alvord gang.  Express Messenger and former lawman Jeff Milton, drove off the bandits despite a serious bullet wound sustained to his arm.  The robbery was unsuccessful, and gang member "Three Fingered Jack" Dunlop was mortally wounded, later to die in Tombstone after confessing to the attempted robbery. Among the members of the gang who were arrested was the notorious outlaw Bill Downing.

In 1901, the Mexican land grant on which the town was situated was purchased by the Boquillas Land and Cattle Company who extended the leases on only the commercial building and several residences into the 1970s.

Geography
Fairbank is located east of the San Pedro River, just off of Arizona State Route 82 at  (31.7231456, -110.1884107).

Demographics
Shortly after its founding, the 1884 population estimate for Fairbank was roughly 100 people. US Census figures, taken every ten years, show the town's population peaking in 1890 at 478 residents, then shrinking to 171 by 1900, and then increasing again to a high of 269 in 1920 before entering a steady decline which ended with the abandonment of the town in the 1970s.

Remnants

By the mid-1970s Fairbank was all but deserted. The final remaining residents left when the buildings were deemed unsafe.  After that, the post office closed, and the side roads became overgrown and largely impassable.  Some years later, in 1986, the former Mexican Land Grant was acquired by the Bureau of Land Management (BLM) and the town was incorporated into the San Pedro Riparian NCA as the "Fairbank Historic Townsite".  What remains of the town of Fairbank is now open to the public.  The remaining structures include:
 A commercial building, an adobe structure that used to house the general store, the post office, and the saloon. The structure has been stabilized by the BLM.
 The Montezuma Hotel which was built in 1889 to the south of the Commercial Building. The hotel was torn down to make way for highway construction, and only portions of its foundation remain.
 A small wooden house, built in 1885, in a style common in the 1880s.
 The schoolhouse, built of gypsum block manufactured in nearby Douglas, AZ, was constructed in 1920, and was a functioning school through the 1930s.
 A larger wooden house, built in 1925.
 A stable and an outhouse, which were built in the early 1940s as part of a Works Progress Administration project based in Fairbank.
 A railroad bridge, northwest of the townsite along the San Pedro River, built in 1927.
 A railroad platform, west of the townsite, along the former railroad line

In March 2007, the BLM restoration of the schoolhouse was completed, and the structure was opened to the public as a museum and information center for Fairbank.

Gallery

See also

 Little Boquillas Ranch
 American Old West
 Boomtown
 History of Arizona
 List of ghost towns in Arizona
 Silver mining in Arizona

References

External links

 Fairbank Historic Townsite – Bureau of Land Management
 Fairbank – Ghost Town of the Month at azghosttowns.com
 Ghost Town Gallery with images of Fairbank, as well as other ghost towns throughout the American west.

1881 establishments in Arizona Territory
Bureau of Land Management areas in Arizona
Cemeteries in Arizona
Ghost towns in Arizona
Former populated places in Cochise County, Arizona
Landmarks in Arizona
Populated places established in 1881
Protected areas of Cochise County, Arizona
San Pedro Valley (Arizona)
Tourist attractions in Cochise County, Arizona